Rafael "Paeng" Villareal Nepomuceno (born January 30, 1957, in Quezon City) Filipino bowler and coach who is a six time World bowling champion. He is a World Bowling Hall of Famer and is the first and only bowling athlete to be awarded with the prestigious IOC (International Olympic Committee) President's Trophy. He was also named International Bowling Athlete of the Millennium by the FIQ (Federation Internationale des Quilleurs) in 1999 and was inducted in the Philippine Sports Hall of Fame in 2018.

Paeng is the first Filipino bowling athlete to be honored with a commemorative stamp when the Philippine Postal corporation issued a World Renowned Filipino Living Legend Stamp bearing his image to celebrate the 75th year anniversary of the first Philippine stamp on November 13, 2021.

He has won the World Cup of Bowling four times (1976, 1980, 1992 and 1996). Nepomuceno has also won the World's Invitational Tournament in 1984 and the World Tenpin Masters championship in 1999.

He has been honored by the Guinness World Records four times. His first was as the "Youngest tenpin bowling world champion" by winning the 1976 Bowling World Cup in Tehran, then for "the most wins of the tenpin bowling world cup (1976, 1980, 1992, and 1996)", and for "the most tenpin bowling titles of 133 and was achieved in Quezon City, Philippines, on 13 July 2019", he broke his own record of 118 titles which was first established in 2007.

Nepomuceno is also a USBC Gold level coach, the only Asian to hold the certification from the United States Bowling Congress. He was named by the Philippine Sportswriters Association the Athlete of the Century in 1999.

The Bowlers Journal International picked Paeng as its Greatest international bowler in its International Edition in September 2004 and also on its November 2013 100-year Anniversary issue.

Paeng at 65 years old rolled his 37th Sanctioned Perfect 300 game at the 24th Sta Lucia East Bowling Association (SLETBA) Open Masters Finals on October 16, 2022.

Early life and education
Rafael "Paeng" Nepomuceno was born on January 30, 1957, in Quezon City, Philippines to Angel Nepomuceno and Teresa Villareal. Paeng Nepomuceno's father, Angel, is a bowling coach while his mother is a former Miss Philippines (1952). He attended La Salle Green Hills for his elementary and high school studies. He studied in Adamson University for his college education.

Career

Competitive career
Paeng Nepomuceno was initially into golf at age 10 but later switched to bowling. He got involved in bowling after he and his father sought shelter at the Mile High Bowling Center in Baguio due to rain. He then asked his father to enroll him in a junior league held at Coronado Lanes in Metro Manila.

His first tournament was the Philippine Junior Masters Championship, which he won at age 15. He also won the Philippine International Masters at age 17, becoming the youngest winner of the tournament.

He competed at the Bowling World Cup, becoming the men's champion in four editions (1976, 1980, 1992, and 1996). He was 19 years old when he won the 1976 edition. For this feat he was recognized by Guinness World Records as "youngest tenpin bowling world champion".

Nepomuceno also competed at the Southeast Asian Games. He won three gold medals in the 1981 edition which was hosted in Manila. In the 1985 Bangkok Games, he won two Gold medals and a Bronze. He won three gold medals at the 1987 games in Jakarta and one gold medal at the 1991 games in Manila.

He also won the 1984 World Invitational Tournament, a competition held in conjunction with the Summer Olympics held in the same year. Nepomuceno also has represented the Philippines in the World Games winning the two bronze medals in total; in the 1993 and 1997 editions both in the men's single event. He also won the World Tenpin Masters in 1999. That year he suffered a left-hand injury, which required surgery which temporarily sidelined him from bowling.

Nepomuceno was given the Sportsman Award at the 2009 QubicaAMF Bowling World Cup. He is the first Filipino to receive the award.

In 2011, he became the oldest winner of the Philippine International Masters, at age 54. By 2020, he had won 133 career titles, six of which are world titles. His latest title, his 133rd, was won at the 2019 PTBA Open Bowling Championships Masters in July 2019.

Coaching career
Nepomuceno joined United States Bowling Congress in 2007 as an International Ambassador to help promote the sport of bowling. In the same year he began aiming to become a USBC certified coach and started training to become a USBC Coaching Level I and Bronze and Silver level Instructor. He hosted seminars discussing coaching and the sport itself. He underwent training the International Training and Research Center in Arlington, Texas, to attain a USBC gold level coaching certification, which he earned by 2013. He received the certification at the World Coaching conference at the USBC headquarters the following year. He is the first and only Asian to attain the certification.

The Philippine Bowling Federation announced on March 21, 2016, that Nepomuceno had been appointed as head coach of the country's national bowlers. Under his watch, Krizziah Tabora became the women's champion of the 2017 QubicaAMF Bowling World Cup.

Honors

By world sporting bodies
The International Olympic Committee awarded Nepomuceno its highest sports award, the IOC President's Trophy during the term of Juan Antonio Samaranch, in November 1999, in a ceremony in Abu Dhabi. In the same year the Federation Internationale des Quilleurs (FIQ) named him as the "Athlete of the Millennium".

He was the first male bowler to be inducted into the International Bowling Hall of Fame, in 1993. His seven foot image is displayed in front of the entrance of the International Bowling Museum in Arlington, Texas, where the hall of fame is hosted.

From the government
Nepomuceno has received recognition from the Philippine Presidents for his feats in bowling. Five Philippine presidents have conferred on him orders and medals, including the Presidential Medal of Merit by Ferdinand Marcos, Philippine Legion of Honor by Joseph Estrada, and the Order of Lakandula with Class of Champion for Life by Gloria Macapagal Arroyo. He is the first Filipino athlete to be awarded the Presidential Medal of Merit (1984) and the Philippine Legion of Honor (1999). The other presidents that have honored Paeng are President Corazon C. Aquino and President Fidel V. Ramos.

Both the Philippine Senate and House of Representatives have declared Paeng the "Greatest Philippine Athlete of All Time". He was also named Philippine Athlete of the Century by the Philippine Sportswriters Association in 1999.

From sportswriters
The Philippine Sportswriters Association recognized Nepomuceno as the Athlete of the Year five times (in 1976, 1980, 1984, 1992, and 1996). The association inducted him to their Hall of Fame in 1997, and in 1999 named him Athlete of the Century and in 2000 he was named among the "Athletes of the Millennium".

The World Bowling Writers awarded him the Mort Luby Jr. Distinguished Service Award, named him World Bowler of the Year three times (1984, 1985, and 1992), and named him to the World Bowling Writers Hall of Fame in 1993 as its first inductee.

Other
The Philippine Jaycees gave Nepomuceno a Ten Outstanding Young Men Award in 1978. He was inducted into the De La Salle Alumni Association Sports Hall of Fame in 2003 and was also awarded with the Distinguished Lasallian Award in 2009. He has been part of Adamson University's Hall of Fame since 2012.

He has been honored four times in the Guinness World Records. They recognized him as the "youngest tenpin bowling champion" by winning the 1976 Bowling World Cup in Tehran, for winning "most wins of the tenpin bowling world cup (1976, 1980, 1992, and 1996)", and for "most tenpin bowling titles" (133 titles as of 2020 records).

Personal life
Paeng Nepomuceno has been married to Saira ("Pinky") Puyat since he was 25. They have a son and two daughters.

Nepomuceno is a physical fitness enthusiast and also participates in runs and lifts weights as cross-training to improve his performance in bowling.

Currently he is a professor and a senior lecturer at the University of the Philippines.

References

Nepumuceno, Rafael
Sportspeople from Quezon City
Filipino people of Spanish descent
Recipients of the Order of Lakandula
1957 births
Living people
Asian Games medalists in bowling
Bowlers at the 1994 Asian Games
Bowlers at the 2002 Asian Games
Bowlers at the 2006 Asian Games
Asian Games gold medalists for the Philippines
Asian Games silver medalists for the Philippines
Medalists at the 1994 Asian Games
Medalists at the 2002 Asian Games
Southeast Asian Games gold medalists for the Philippines
Southeast Asian Games silver medalists for the Philippines
Southeast Asian Games bronze medalists for the Philippines
Southeast Asian Games medalists in bowling
Academic staff of the University of the Philippines
Adamson University alumni
Competitors at the 1993 World Games
Competitors at the 1997 World Games
World Games bronze medalists
World Games medalists in bowling
Competitors at the 1991 Southeast Asian Games
Competitors at the 1993 Southeast Asian Games
Recipients of the Presidential Medal of Merit (Philippines)
Philippine Sports Hall of Fame inductees